The Order of the Star of Romania (Romanian: Ordinul Steaua României) is Romania's highest civil Order and second highest State decoration after the defunct Order of Michael the Brave. It is awarded by the President of Romania. It has five ranks, from lowest to the highest: Officer, Commander, Grand Officer, Grand Cross, and Grand Cross with Collar.

History

In 1863, Alexandru Ioan Cuza, the Domnitor of the United Principalities of Moldavia and Wallachia, asked the Romanian representative to Paris to contact the then well-known jewellery house Krétly, to manufacture a state decoration. Krétly presented a model, which was immediately accepted by the domnitor, and based on his agreement, 1,000 pieces of the order were made. It was decided that the order would have five ranks: Knight (Cavaler), Officer (Ofițer), Commander (Comandor), Grand Officer (Mare Ofițer), and Grand Cross (Mare Cruce).

Unlike all other decorations in that time that were mostly inspired on the French Légion d'honneur, or which had their insignia like a Maltese cross, the model proposed by Krétly for this order was a blue cross crosslet (cruce repetată), a design that was then unique in decorational design.

The domnitor decided that the name of the honour would be "The Order of the Union" ("Ordinul Unirii"). It was planned to institute the order on 24 January 1864, the date when the 5th anniversary of his election would be celebrated and a moment that marked the unification of the principalities of Moldavia and Wallachia. Because of this, the motto of the new order would fit the event: "GENERE ET CORDES FRATRES" ("BROTHERS THROUGH ORIGINS AND FEELINGS"). The obverse of the insignia would bear the numbers "5" and "24", the days of January when he was elected in both Moldova and Wallachia.

However, due to the overthrow of Alexandru Ioan Cuza by a palace coup, he was unable to actually institute the order, and he awarded the insignia therefore only as a personal present, not as a state decoration. Most of the insignia produced for him remained stored in the Royal Palace's dungeons.

In April 1877, when Romania gained independence from the Ottoman Empire, the debate regarding the institution of Romanian decorations was revived. Mihail Kogălniceanu, Minister of Foreign Affairs in the Ion Brătianu cabinet, took part in the debates in the Assembly of Deputies regarding the institution of a state decoration. Because of the already earlier supplied "Order of The Union", it was decided that the shape of the decoration would be the same, modifying only the domnitor's seal. The motto was also changed, because the old one was not appropriate to the moment, to "IN FIDE SALUS" ("IN FAITH IS THE SALVATION"). Regarding the name, Kogălniceanu insisted on "Steaua Dunării" ("The Star of The Danube").

The name "Steaua României" ("The Star of Romania") appeared on May 10, 1887, when the law was voted in the Parliament, as the first law of the Sovereign Romania.

By Royal Decree (no. 1545/1932), King Carol II changed the order of precedence in the Romanian honours system. As a result, in 1932, The Star of Romania dropped in precedence from second place (where it had been since 1906) to fourth place (after the Order of Carol I and the Order of Ferdinand I). In 1937, it dropped to seventh place. The main shape of the order, the blue repeated cross (called also "Romanian cross") was kept, but the rays between the cross' arms were replaced by four heraldic eagles with wings spread, the insignia of King Carol I was placed on the obverse, and the reverse bore the year of its establishment, "1877". Also the number of persons that could be awarded The Star of Romania was increased:

 Knight (Cavaler): 1,000 civilians and 350 military;
 Officer (Ofițer): 500 civilians and 150 military;
 Commodore or Commander (Comandor): 200 civilians and 75 military;
 Grand Officer (Mare Ofițer): 75 civilians and 25 military;
 Grand Cross (Mare Cruce): 35 civilians and 10 military.

In 1938, the order was given a superior rank, called "Clasa I" (First Class in English), between the Grand Officer rank and the Grand Cross rank, with a maximum of 50 civilians and 15 military personnel.

The statutes established by King Carol II were changed by General Ion Antonescu (who became Conducător on 4 September 1940). Generally, the rules were the ones used during World War I. The order "The Star of Romania" became the second in the national hierarchy, after that of the Order of Michael the Brave.

Inspired by the German Iron Cross, Ion Antonescu decided that the first three grades of the orders the Star of Romania and the Crown of Romania, with spades (swords), and the ribbon of The Medal "The Military Virtue" would be awarded for exceptionally brave acts with an oak leaf, attached to the ribbon.

After 1948, all the existing decorations were outlawed, and their wearing was forbidden. Just by keeping the insignia, one was considered a delinquent in the first years of communism.

After many attempts, in 1998/1999 the National Order "The Star of Romania" was reinstituted, with a design similar to the one used in 1932, but without the insignia of King Carol I, and with the republican insignia.

Grades
As per Law 29/2000, regarding Romania's national system of decorations, there are currently six grades:

 1st Class:  Collar (Colan);
 2nd Class:  Grand Cross (Mare Cruce);
 3rd Class:  Grand Officer (Mare Ofiţer);
 4th Class:  Commander (Comandor);
 5th Class:  Officer (Ofiţer);
 6th Class:  Knight (Cavaler).

Notable recipients

First issue (1877–1948)
 Ernesto Burzagli
 Archduke Eugen of Austria (1881)
 Pratap Singh of Idar (1921)
 Jan Karcz
 Aristide Razu (1918)
 Harry Gideon Wells (1919)
 Ismail of Johor (1920)
 Hendrik Pieter Nicolaas Muller (1922)
 Scarlat Cantacuzino
 Artur Phleps
 Edward Rydz-Śmigły
 Jack Corbu (1930)
 Stanisław Maczek
 Amha Selassie of Ethiopia
 Rudolf Walden
 Fritz Witt (1942)
 Martin Unrein
 Jagatjit Singh of Kapurthala (1935)
 Walter Staudinger (1942)
 Ismail of Johor (1942)
 Walther Wenck (1943)
 Emmerich Jordan (1944)
 Samuel C. Cumming
 Paul de Smet de Naeyer
 Joseph Maria von Radowitz

Second issue (since 1998)

Foreign citizens

By class

1st Class Collars
 Abdullah II of Jordan
 George Abela
 Valdas Adamkus
 Albert II of Belgium
 Albert II, Prince of Monaco
 Amha Selassie
 Teoctist Arăpașu
 Gloria Macapagal Arroyo
 Traian Băsescu
 Beatrix of the Netherlands
 Zine El Abidine Ben Ali
 Carl XVI Gustaf
 Jacques Chirac
 Carlo Azeglio Ciampi
 Emil Constantinescu
 Nicolae Corneanu
 Ion Dragalina
 Andrzej Duda
 Elizabeth II
 Matthew Festing
 Joachim Gauck
 Mihai Ghimpu
 Dalia Grybauskaitė
 Tarja Halonen
 Harald V of Norway
 Ioan Holender
 François Hollande
 Ion Iliescu
 Toomas Hendrik Ilves
 Jaber Al-Ahmad Al-Sabah
 Lech Kaczyński
 Andrej Kiska
 Thomas Klestil
 Émile Lahoud
 Margrethe II of Denmark
 Sergio Mattarella
 Michael I of Romania
 Giorgio Napolitano
 Nursultan Nazarbayev
 Josef Šnejdárek
 Angelo Sodano
 Konstantinos Stephanopoulos
 Petar Stoyanov
 Hamad bin Khalifa Al Thani
 Gherman Titov
 Ezer Weizman
2nd Class Grand Crosses
 Alois Lexa von Aehrenthal
 Martti Ahtisaari
 Yıldırım Akbulut
 Albert I of Belgium
 Archduke Albrecht, Duke of Teschen
 Prince Albert Victor, Duke of Clarence and Avondale
 Alexander III of Russia
 Alexander of Battenberg
 Alexandra, Countess of Frederiksborg
 Prince Alfons of Bavaria
 Alfred, 2nd Prince of Montenuovo
 Teoctist Arăpașu
 Count Kasimir Felix Badeni
 Ehud Barak
 Bartholomew I of Constantinople
 David Beatty, 1st Earl Beatty
 Kurt Beck
 Radu Beligan
 Silvio Berlusconi
 Andrew Bertie
 Birendra of Nepal
 Herbert von Bismarck
 Otto von Bismarck
 Albrecht von Boeselager
 Victor, Prince Napoléon
 Boutros Boutros-Ghali
 Josip Broz Tito
 Bernhard von Bülow
 Ernesto Burzagli
 Leo von Caprivi
 Prince Carl, Duke of Västergötland
 Carol I of Romania
 Charles, Prince of Wales 
 Christian IX of Denmark
 Prince Christian of Schleswig-Holstein
 Doina Cornea
 Pat Cox
 Patriarch Diodoros of Jerusalem
 Bülent Ecevit
 Edmond de Gaiffier d'Hestroy
 Edward VII
 Ernest Louis, Grand Duke of Hesse
 Ernst I, Duke of Saxe-Altenburg
 Archduke Eugen of Austria
 Prince Eugen, Duke of Närke
 Laurent Fabius
 Felipe VI of Spain
 Ferdinand I of Romania
 Archduke Franz Ferdinand of Austria
 Franz Joseph I of Austria
 Frederick VIII of Denmark
 Frederick I, Duke of Anhalt
 Frederick III, German Emperor
 Prince Frederick of Hohenzollern-Sigmaringen
 Frederick William, Grand Duke of Mecklenburg-Strelitz
 Frederik, Crown Prince of Denmark
 Kurt Fricke
 Prince Friedrich Leopold of Prussia
 Prince Georg of Bavaria
 Agenor Maria Gołuchowski
 Dan Grigore
 Eremia Grigorescu
 Wilhelm von Hahnke
 Ionel Haiduc
 Tarja Halonen
 Rafic Hariri
 Prince Heinrich of Hesse and by Rhine
 Prince Henry of Prussia (1862–1929)
 Stefan Hell
 Henri, Grand Duke of Luxembourg
 Henrik, Prince Consort of Denmark
 Jaap de Hoop Scheffer
 Klaus Iohannis
 Mugur Isărescu
 Prince Joachim of Denmark
 Archduke Joseph Karl of Austria
 Lionel Jospin
 Jean-Claude Juncker
 Ioan Kalinderu
 Viatcheslav Moshe Kantor
 Karekin II
 Karl Anton, Prince of Hohenzollern
 Hüseyin Kıvrıkoğlu
 Konstantin of Hohenlohe-Schillingsfürst
 Aleksey Kuropatkin
 Aleksander Kwaśniewski
 Eugeniusz Kwiatkowski
 Chuan Leekpai
 Prince Leopold of Bavaria
 Leopold, Prince of Hohenzollern
 Liviu Librescu
 Louis IV, Grand Duke of Hesse
 Prince Ludwig Ferdinand of Bavaria
 Archduke Ludwig Viktor of Austria
 Luís I of Portugal
 Horia Macellariu
 Maria Teresa, Grand Duchess of Luxembourg
 Michael I of Romania
 Grand Duke Michael Alexandrovich of Russia
 Louis Michel
 Milan I of Serbia
 Helmuth von Moltke the Younger
 Louis Mountbatten, 1st Earl Mountbatten of Burma
 Hendrik Pieter Nicolaas Muller
 Valeriu Munteanu (politician)
 Adrian Năstase
 Nicholas II of Russia
 Mariana Nicolesco
 Olav V of Norway
 Archduke Otto of Austria (1865–1906)
 George Emil Palade
 Queen Paola of Belgium
 Alexander August Wilhelm von Pape
 Pedro II of Brazil
 Maurice Pellé
 Göran Persson
 Nicolae Petrescu-Comnen
 Christian Poncelet
 Romano Prodi
 Mozaffar ad-Din Shah Qajar
 Antoni Wilhelm Radziwiłł
 Jean-Pierre Raffarin
 Archduke Rainer Ferdinand of Austria
 Ioan Rășcanu
 George Robertson, Baron Robertson of Port Ellen
 Gil Carlos Rodríguez Iglesias
 Prince Rudolf of Liechtenstein
 Rudolf, Crown Prince of Austria
 Rupprecht, Crown Prince of Bavaria
 Edward Rydz-Śmigły
 Gerhard Schröder
 Wolfgang Schüssel
 Walter Schwimmer
 Queen Silvia of Sweden
 Jagatjit Singh
 Pratap Singh of Idar
 Vassilios Skouris
 Queen Sofía of Spain
 Edmund Stoiber
 Jan Syrový
 Eduard Taaffe, 11th Viscount Taaffe
 Alfred von Tirpitz
 Alexandru Todea
 Ernest Troubridge
 Charles d'Ursel
 Victoria, Crown Princess of Sweden
 Grigore Vieru
 Charles J. Vopicka
 Rudolf Walden
 Georg Wassilko von Serecki
 Alan Watson, Baron Watson of Richmond
 Count Hans Weiss
 William, Prince of Hohenzollern
 William, Prince of Wied
 Sergei Witte
 August zu Eulenburg
 Adrian Zuckerman (attorney)
3rd Class Grand Officers
 Dinu Adameșteanu
 Radu Aldulescu (musician)
 Ioan Arhip
 Constantin C. Arion
 Randolph L. Braham (Resigned)
 Gheorghe Brega
 Nicolae Cajal
 Alexandru Cernat
 Dietrich von Choltitz
 Gheorghe Cipăianu
 Liviu Ciulei
 Nadia Comăneci
 Ileana Cotrubaș
 Nicolae Dăscălescu
 Constantin Dumitrescu (general)
 Ivan Fichev
 Ismail of Johor
 Lucien Loizeau
 Marian-Jean Marinescu
 Lucian Pintilie
 Constantin Poenaru
 Dumitru Prunariu
 Ioan Mihail Racoviță
 Constantin Sănătescu
 Hans-Georg von Seidel
 Alexandru Slătineanu
 Simion Stoilow
 Alexandru Tzigara-Samurcaș
 Gheorghe Vlădescu-Răcoasa
 Elie Wiesel
 Arthur Zimmermann
 Alexandru Zub
4th Class Commanders
 Robert Aderholt
 Vasile Atanasiu
 Grigore Bălan
 James Berry (surgeon)
 Ion Boițeanu
 Randolph L. Braham
 Leonid Brezhnev
 Karl von Bülow
 Ronald L. Burgess Jr.
 Leopold Bürkner
 Ernesto Burzagli
 Ion Buzdugan
 Ben Cardin
 Nicolae Ciupercă
 Constantin Constantinescu-Claps
 Aurel Cosma
 Lucian Croitoru
 Salvator Cupcea
 Mircea Dinescu
 Eugen Doga
 Émile Dossin de Saint-Georges
 Mihai Drăgănescu
 Wim van Eekelen
 Ștefan Fălcoianu
 Nikolaus von Falkenhorst
 Angela Gheorghiu
 Hans Globke
 Maximilian Hacman
 Orrin Hatch
 Friedrich-Wilhelm Hauck
 Francis Howard (British Army officer, born 1848)
 Dietrich von Hülsen-Haeseler
 Sergěj Ingr
 Ron Johnson
 Hunor Kelemen
 Gunther Krichbaum
 Emil Krukowicz-Przedrzymirski
 Tadeusz Kutrzeba
 Alexandru Lapedatu
 Chris Lauzen
 Wolf Lepenies
 Charles W. Lyons
 Stanisław Maczek
 Solomon Marcus
 Valeriu Moldovan
 Vasile Moldoveanu
 Teodor Negoiță
 Devin Nunes
 Artur Phleps
 Tadeusz Piskor
 Karl von Plettenberg
 David Popescu
 Andrei Rădulescu
 Aristide Razu
 Mike Rogers (Alabama politician)
 Frank Rolleston
 Marco Rubio
 Nicolae Samsonovici
 Gustav von Senden-Bibran
 Ioanel Sinescu
 Ilie Șteflea
 Rudolf Stöger-Steiner von Steinstätten
 Anastase Stolojan
 Dejan Subotić
 Nicolae Tătăranu
 Rudolf Toussaint
 Alexandru Vulpe
 Jackie Walorski
 Bolesław Wieniawa-Długoszowski
5th Class Officers
 Paul Alexiu
 Ilie Antonescu
 Petre Antonescu (general)
 Constantion Bădescu
 Ștefan Balaban
 Ioan A. Bassarabescu
 Constantin Brătescu
 Mihai Ciucă
 Constantin Climescu
 Mihail Corbuleanu
 Dumitru Coroamă
 Ilie Crețulescu
 Anton Crihan
 Constantin Cristescu
 Nicolae Dabija (soldier)
 Dumitru Dămăceanu
 Alexandru Dobriceanu
 Constantin Doncea
 Anton Durcovici
 Constantin Eftimiu
 Eremia Grigorescu
 Jan Karcz
 Radu Korne
 Dan Lupașcu
 Raoul Magrin-Vernerey
 Gheorghe Manoliu
 Sergiu Niță
 Alexandru Pastia
 Oana Pellea
 Irina Petrescu
 Artur Phleps
 Constantin Poenaru
 Iulian Pop
 David Praporgescu
 Nicolae Samsonovici
 Alexandru Șerbănescu
 Oleg Serebrian
 Constantin Tobescu
6th Class Knights
 Ecaterina Andronescu
 Gheorghe Avramescu
 Constantin Bălăceanu-Stolnici
 Colin Robert Ballard
 Gelu Barbu
 Viorel P. Barbu
 Ion Besoiu
 Marcian Bleahu
 Mihai Brediceanu
 Nicolae Cambrea
 Scarlat Cantacuzino
 Ion Caramitru
 Nicolae Ciupercă
 Dina Cocea
 Titus Corlățean
 Pierre de Coubertin
 Corina Crețu
 Ioan Culcer
 Samuel C. Cumming
 Marțian Dan
 Neagu Djuvara
 Valer Dorneanu
 Mariana Drăgescu
 Tudor Gheorghe
 Marcel Guguianu
 Thomas Hunton
 Gabriel Liiceanu
 Leonard Mociulschi
 Ovidiu Iuliu Moldovan
 Iulia Motoc
 Marioara Murărescu
 Dan Nica
 Andrei Oișteanu
 Richard W. O'Neill
 Gabriel Oprea
 Octavian Paler
 Gică Petrescu
 Teodosie Petrescu
 Colea Răutu
 Aristide Razu
 Mihai Tănăsescu
 Radu Timofte
 László Tőkés (Withdrawn)
 Corneliu Vadim Tudor (Withdrawn)(2004 until 2007, when it was withdrawn) 
 Petre Țuțea
Unknown Class
 Otto Adler
 Ilham Aliyev
 Petre Andrei
 Kofi Annan
 Gheorghe Arsenescu
 Giuseppe Arzilli
 Beatrix of the Netherlands
 Tarcisio Bertone
 Bhumibol Adulyadej
 Josef Bílý
 Volkan Bozkır
 Constantin Budișteanu
 George W. Bush
 Gheorghe Buzatu
 Mihail Cămărașu
 Fernando Henrique Cardoso
 Aníbal Cavaco Silva
 Marin Ceaușu
 Mauro Chiaruzzi
 Henri Cihoski
 Jack Corbu
 Paul de Smet de Naeyer
 Süleyman Demirel
 Radko Dimitriev
 Roman Dmowski
 Werner Ehrig
 Eddie Fenech Adami
 Alberto Fujimori
 Victor Gomoiu
 Árpád Göncz
 Kolinda Grabar-Kitarović
 Gheorghe Ionescu-Sisești
 Emmerich Jordan
 Juan Carlos I
 Mihail Kogălniceanu
 Stiliyan Kovachev
 Milan Kučan
 Leonid Kuchma
 Ricardo Lagos
 Ivan Loiko
 Mircea Lucescu
 Petru Lucinschi
 Ferenc Mádl
 Leon Malhomme
 Rexhep Meidani
 Stjepan Mesić
 Miron Mitrea
 Alois Mock
 Aleksander Piotr Mohl
 Maria Morganti
 Dumitru C. Moruzi
 Bolesław Mościcki
 Zayed bin Sultan Al Nahyan
 Danail Nikolaev
 Pietro Parolin
 Rosen Plevneliev
 Kazimierz Porębski
 David Popovici
 Ștefan Procopiu
 Roberto Raschi
 Arnold Rüütel
 Said Halim Pasha
 Jorge Sampaio
 Eustachy Sapieha
 Marian Sârbu
 Rudolf Schuster
 Walter Staudinger
 Michel Suleiman
 Jan Szembek (diplomat)
 Păstorel Teodoreanu
 Nicolae Timofti
 Martin Unrein
 Guy Verhofstadt
 Vaira Vīķe-Freiberga
 Matei Vlădescu
 Harry Gideon Wells
 Walther Wenck
 Fritz Witt
 Valdis Zatlers
 Ferdynand Zarzycki
 Ernesto Zedillo

See also
List of military decorations
National Decorations System (Romania)

References

Other sources
  Ordinul național "Steaua României", Presidency of Romania website
  Recipients of the order (Excel sheet), Presidency of Romania website

Romanian decorations
Military awards and decorations of Romania
 
Star of Romania, Order of the